Niue Rugby Football Union is the governing body for rugby union in Niue. It was founded in 1952, and became affiliated to the World Rugby (formerly the IRB) in 1999.

The Niue Rugby Football Union is a member of the Federation of Oceania Rugby Unions (FORU), and was also a member of the former Pacific Islands Rugby Alliance and was eligible to supply players to the Pacific Islanders team.

Rugby union in Niue

Rugby union is the most popular sport in Niue. It is a tier-three rugby union playing nation.

National team
The Niue national rugby union team first started playing in 1983. They have yet to qualify for the Rugby World Cup.

Niue won the current FORU Oceania Cup in 2008, defeating New Caledonia 27–5 in the final on 1 September 2008.

History
Teams from Niue have competed in the Commonwealth Games.

When Niue competed in the 2001 Wellington 7s, they took a completely local-based squad, and though they scored tries against England and Canada, they were crushed in most games. Infamously, they surprised everyone by beating Japan 31–19 in 2002.

The New Zealand player Frank Bunce is the great nephew of Sir Robert Rex, the former Premier of Niue.

See also
Niue national rugby union team
Niue national rugby sevens team
Niue Island Sports Association

References

External links
 IRB Niue page

 Federation of Oceania Rugby Unions, Niue page
 Oceania Nations, Niue

Rugby union in Niue
Organisations based in Niue
1952 establishments in Niue
Rugby union governing bodies in Oceania
Sports organizations established in 1952